is a sequel and the third season of the Saiyuki anime television series produced by Studio Pierrot. Adapted from the manga of Saiyuki Reload by Kazuya Minekura, the series is directed by Tetsuya Endo, written by Tetsuya Endo and composed by Daisuke Ikeda.

The series is the sequel of Saiyuki Reload, premiered on TV Tokyo from April 1, 2004 to September 23, 2004 and consist of 26 episodes. Saiyuki Reload Gunlock follows some of the events of the Saiyuki Reload manga. Much of the Hazel arc had not yet been written when the anime was being produced, therefore the story and characterization of Hazel in particular is different from that in the manga. Gunlock starts off deviated from the manga, until midway into the series, but strays from it during its finale.

Saiyuki Reload Gunlock was licensed by Geneon in North America,  A total of seven DVDs of the Saiyuki Reload Gunlock anime series were released by Geneon, along with an Artbox DVD which was published on May 2, 2006. Geneon released the first volume on April 25, which include the first four episodes of the 26-episode series, also a Special Edition of the first volume released on May 2, 2006. A Complete box set was originally solicited for November 20, 2007, but never released due to Geneon cancelling DVD sales.

AZN TV aired the series on October 29, 2007 to December 25, 2007.

On March 10, 2021, Crunchyroll added the series for streaming.

On September 27, 2022, Discotek Media licensed the anime for a Blu-ray release in standard definition.

A new OVA has been released by Studio Pierrot, which covers the "Burial" arc of the Saiyuki Reload manga; it is called Saiyuki Reload: Burial. An anime television series adaptation of the Saiyuki Reload Blast manga series aired from July 5 to September 20, 2017, on Tokyo MX, TV Aichi, BS11, Sun TV. It ran for 12 episodes. Also a new anime series produced by Liden Films titled Saiyuki Reload: Zeroin has been announced in January 10, 2021. It aired from January 6 to March 31, 2022, on AT-X and other networks.

Three pieces of theme music are used for the episodes—one opening themes and two ending themes. The opening themes is "Don't look back again" by WAG. The two ending themes, "Mitsumeteitai" by flow-war and "Shiro no Jumon" by doa.



Episode list

References

External links 
 Saiyuki Reload Gunlock website 
Official Studio Pierrot Saiyuki Reload Gunlock website 
Studio Pierrot's Saiyuki RELOAD Gunlock Homepage  

Saiyuki (manga)
Saiyuki